Beta Ethniki 1988–89 complete season.

League table

Results

Promotion play-off

Relegation play-off

Top scorers

References

External links 
RSSSF.org

Second level Greek football league seasons
Greece
2